Santo André de Vagos is a village and a civil parish of the municipality of Vagos, Portugal. The population in 2011 was 2,033, in an area of 12.44 km2.

References

Freguesias of Vagos